Hohenbergia catingae is a plant species in the genus Hohenbergia. This species is endemic to Brazil ((Minas Gerais, Bahia, Pernambuco, Paraíba)).

References

BSI Journal V11(5), HOHENBERGIA CATINGAE Ule Retrieved 24 December 2011

catingae
Endemic flora of Brazil
Flora of Bahia
Flora of Minas Gerais
Flora of Paraíba
Flora of Pernambuco